Oxygen pulse is a physiological term for oxygen uptake per heartbeat at rest.

References

Respiratory physiology